Race Course is a settlement in Clarendon Parish in Jamaica. It has a population of 3,003 as of 2009. It is 34 mi (or 55 km) west of Kingston, Jamaica, the capital city.

References

Populated places in Clarendon Parish, Jamaica